Regina Oja (Regina Ermits from 2022; born 31 January 1996) is an Estonian biathlete. She competes in the Biathlon World Cup.

She achieved her best results in the Biathlon World Cup at Pokljuka, when she finished second in the single mixed relay event with her compatriot Rene Zahkna.

Personal
Her father is former biathlete Kristjan Oja. She is married to former biathlete Kalev Ermits.

Biathlon results
All results are sourced from the International Biathlon Union.

Olympic Games

World Championships

World Cup

Team podiums
1 podiums  

*Results are from IBU races which include the Biathlon World Cup, Biathlon World Championships and the Winter Olympic Games.

Updated on 22 March 2021

Other competition

European Championships

Junior/Youth World Championships

See also
List of professional sports families

References

External links

1996 births
Living people
Estonian female biathletes
Sportspeople from Tallinn
Biathletes at the 2022 Winter Olympics
Olympic biathletes of Estonia